Gordon Keith Barwell (1944 – April 21, 1988) was a Canadian football player who played for the Saskatchewan Roughriders. In his 10 seasons with the Saskatchewan Roughriders, he amassed 242 catches, 4,314 yards, and 32 touchdowns. Grey Cup with them in 1966. He previously played football on the Saskatoon Hilltops junior football team. In 1988, he died of brain cancer. He was a minister in his later years. Today, the Gord Barwell Award is awarded each year to a CFL player who exhibits exemplary Christian conduct and leadership both on and off the field.

References

1944 births
1988 deaths
Players of Canadian football from Saskatchewan
Canadian football ends
Saskatchewan Roughriders players
Sportspeople from Saskatoon
Deaths from brain cancer in Canada